Kambila  is a village and rural commune in the Cercle of Kati in the Koulikoro Region of south-western Mali. The commune has an area of 429 km2 and contains 15 villages. In the 2009 census the commune had a population of 13,974. The village of Kambila lies just to the east of the Route Nationale 1 (RN1) and 9 km north of Kati, the chef-lieu of the cercle.

References

External links
.

Communes of Koulikoro Region